Omrabad (also Romanized as ‘Omrābād, Umrābād, ‘Amrābad, and ‘Omarābād) is a village in Pish Khowr Rural District, Pish Khowr District, Famenin County, Hamadan Province, Iran. At the 2006 census, its population was 155, in 38 families.

References 

Populated places in Famenin County